Catonsville High School (CHS) is a four-year public high school in Catonsville, Maryland. It is located on the southwest side of Baltimore County, Maryland, close to the Baltimore border near Anne Arundel and Howard County, just outside the Baltimore Beltway.

History
The original school traces its roots to Catonsville School, formed in 1903. Students were taught at the original brick building until 1910, when a large new school was dedicated to relieve overcrowding. In 1925, Baltimore County purchased land and buildings from the Catonsville Country Club with the intention of making it the new high school.

In 1954, a new building was dedicated at the school's current location. The campus was originally the "Farmlands" estate, owned in the 19th century by Theodore Lurman. The Lurman Woodland Theater on the school's grounds is named in his memory.

The school benefited from a  expansion in 1999.  There have been other upgrades and renovations to many of the structures to keep the building as modern as possible.

Academics
Catonsville High School received a 64.5 out of a possible 100 points (64%) on the 2018-2019 Maryland State Department of Education Report Card and received a 4 out of 5 star rating, ranking in the 61st percentile among all Maryland schools.

Students
The 20192020 enrollment at Catonsville High School was 1826. The graduation rate at Catonsville High School ranged from 94% in 1998 to a low of 83% in 2001.

Athletics

State championships
Girls Cross Country:
2A 1993 
Boys Cross Country:
Class A 1946, 1959
Class AA 1960, 1964
Soccer:
Pre-MPSSAA Combined Class 1918, 1919, 1921, 1928
Volleyball:
Class A 1979, 1980, 1981,1982, 1983, 1986
Class B 1987
Girls Softball:
4A 2021
Girls Basketball:
4A 2017
Boys Basketball:
Pre-MPSSAA 1928
Class A 1992
Girls Indoor Track:
3A TIE 1992

Notable alumni
 Jeff Altenburg - professional race car driver.
 John Christ - professional musician and original guitarist for the metal band Danzig
 John Cluster - Delegate, State of Maryland Representing the 8th District
 Jasmine Dickey - professional basketball player for the Dallas Wings in the Women's National Basketball Association (WNBA).
 Roy Heiser - former professional baseball player.
 Brian Jozwiak - Offensive lineman for the West Virginia University and the Kansas City Chiefs
 Dan Keech - Rapper
 Adam Kolarek - pitcher in the Los Angeles Dodgers organization
 Jeff Nelson - former Major League Baseball pitcher with the New York Yankees and Seattle Mariners
 Andy Stack - professional musician and drummer/keyboardist for Wye Oak
 Tim Suhrstedt - cinematographer, Teen Wolf, Office Space

See also
 List of Schools in Baltimore County, Maryland

References

External links

 Catonsville High School
 CHS history web site with pictures

Catonsville, Maryland
Public high schools in Maryland
Baltimore County Public Schools
Educational institutions established in 1903
Middle States Commission on Secondary Schools
Baltimore County, Maryland landmarks
1903 establishments in Maryland